All Is One is the fifth album by the Israeli oriental metal band, Orphaned Land, which was released on June 24, 2013. It is the first album to feature guitarist Chen Balbus who replaced the co-founding member and guitarist Matti Svatitzky in 2012. It is also the last album to feature the co founding member and guitarist (along with oriental instruments) Yossi Sassi who left the band in 2014.

Songs
The song Brother is a ballad that discusses the relationship between Isaac and Ishmael.
The song is written from the point of view of one brother (Isaac) who writes a letter that forgives the other brother (Ishmael) for becoming enemies.

The lyrics of the song Let the Truce Be Known was inspired from the story of the Christmas truce in World War I which in it the soldiers celebrated together Christmas and the day after, they returned to kill each other. The song was composed along with the Israeli artist, Kobi Aflalo.

The Song Shamaim (In English: Sky, In Hebrew: שמיים) was written by the Israeli artist Yehuda Poliker, and it combines elements and concepts that were in the band's previous albums. the song is a closing cycle for the band, mostly because the band's name is taken from Poliker's song "Winds of War" (רוחות מלחמה).

The song Our Own Messiah contains a verse from the Jewish prayer, Avinu Malkeinu.

Track listing
All songs written and composed by Orphaned Land except where noted.

Personnel
Orphaned Land
Kobi Farhi – vocals
Yossi Sassi – electric guitars, acoustic guitars, classic guitars, bouzouki, chumbush
Chen Balbus – electric guitar
Uri Zelcha – bass guitar
Matan Shmuely – drums

Production
Mira Awad – female vocals
Shahar Choir – vocals
Elram Amram – vocals
Sahar Amram – vocals
Moran Magal – piano
Roei Friedman – percussions
Sami Bachar – guitar
Tzahi Ventura – flute
Turkish ensemble – violins

References

2013 albums
Orphaned Land albums
Century Media Records albums
Albums produced by Jens Bogren